A glitch is a short-lived fault in a system.

Glitch may also refer to:

Art, entertainment, and media

Fictional entities
Glitch (character), a character in Tin Man
Glitch, an electronic monster character in Garfield: Caught in the Act
Glitch, a character in Dance Central 2 and Dance Central 3
Glitch, the protagonist in Metal Arms: Glitch in the System
Glitch, Bob's keytool in ReBoot

Films
Glitch!, a 1988 film by Nico Mastorakis
The Glitch (2008), a short film

Gaming
Glitch (video game), a 2011 defunct online massively-multiplayer game
Glitching, an activity involving finding and exploiting flaws or glitches in video games

Music
Glitch (music), a genre of electronic music that formed in the late 1990s
Glitch (album), a 2013 album by V V Brown
"Glitch", a 1996 song by Blind Melon from Nico
"Glitch", a 2017 song by Chon from Homey
"Glitch", a 2019 song by Martin Garrix and Julian Jordan from The Martin Garrix Experience
"Glitch", a 2022 song by Taylor Swift on the extended version of Midnights
"Glitches", a 2003 song by V Shape Mind from Cul-De-Sac

Television
"Glitch" (The Outer Limits), a 2000 episode of The Outer Limits
Glitch (Australian TV series), a 2015 Australian television drama series
"The Glitch", a season 12 episode of Midsomer Murders
Glitch (South Korean TV series), a 2022 television series

Other art, entertainment, and media
Glitch art
GLitcH!, a comic strip by Ed Wiens
Glitch Productions, the company producing the web series Meta Runner

Other uses
Glitch (astronomy), a sudden increase in the rotational frequency of a rotation-powered pulsar
 Glitch (New York company), a software company est. 2000
 Glitch (Minnesota company), a software company est. 2013